In physics, mathematics, and related fields, a wave is a propagating dynamic disturbance (change from equilibrium) of one or more quantities. Waves can be periodic, in which case those quantities oscillate repeatedly about an equilibrium (resting) value at some frequency. When the entire waveform moves in one direction, it is said to be a traveling wave; by contrast, a pair of superimposed periodic waves traveling in opposite directions makes a standing wave. In a standing wave, the amplitude of vibration has nulls at some positions where the wave amplitude appears smaller or even zero. Waves are often described by a wave equation (standing wave field of two opposite waves) or a one-way wave equation for single wave propagation in a defined direction. 

Two types of waves are most commonly studied in classical physics. In a mechanical wave, stress and strain fields oscillate about a mechanical equilibrium. A mechanical wave is a local deformation (strain) in some physical medium that propagates from particle to particle by creating local stresses that cause strain in neighboring particles too. For example, sound waves are variations of the local pressure and particle motion that propagate through the medium. Other examples of mechanical waves are seismic waves, gravity waves, surface waves and string vibrations. In an electromagnetic wave (such as light), coupling between the electric and magnetic fields which sustains propagation of a wave involving these fields according to Maxwell's equations. Electromagnetic waves can travel through a vacuum and through some dielectric media (at wavelengths where they are considered transparent). Electromagnetic waves, according to their frequencies (or wavelengths) have more specific designations including radio waves, infrared radiation, terahertz waves, visible light, ultraviolet radiation, X-rays and gamma rays.

Other types of waves include gravitational waves, which are disturbances in spacetime that propagate according to general relativity; heat diffusion waves; plasma waves that combine mechanical deformations and electromagnetic fields; reaction–diffusion waves, such as in the Belousov–Zhabotinsky reaction; and many more. Mechanical and electromagnetic waves transfer energy, momentum, and information, but they do not transfer particles in the medium. In mathematics and electronics waves are studied as signals. On the other hand, some waves have envelopes which do not move at all such as standing waves (which are fundamental to music) and hydraulic jumps. Some, like the probability waves of quantum mechanics, may be completely static.

A physical wave field is almost always confined to some finite region of space, called its domain. For example, the seismic waves generated by earthquakes are significant only in the interior and surface of the planet, so they can be ignored outside it. However, waves with infinite domain, that extend over the whole space, are commonly studied in mathematics, and are very valuable tools for understanding physical waves in finite domains.

A plane wave is an important mathematical idealization where the disturbance is identical along any (infinite) plane normal to a specific direction of travel. Mathematically, the simplest wave is a sinusoidal plane wave in which at any point the field experiences simple harmonic motion at one frequency. In linear media, complicated waves can generally be decomposed as the sum of many sinusoidal plane waves having different directions of propagation and/or different frequencies. A plane wave is classified as a transverse wave if the field disturbance at each point is described by a vector perpendicular to the direction of propagation (also the direction of energy transfer); or longitudinal wave if those vectors are aligned with the propagation direction. Mechanical waves include both transverse and longitudinal waves; on the other hand electromagnetic plane waves are strictly transverse while sound waves in fluids (such as air) can only be longitudinal. That physical direction of an oscillating field relative to the propagation direction is also referred to as the wave's polarization, which can be an important attribute.

Mathematical description

Single waves

In mathematical terms, it is usually a vector in the Cartesian three-dimensional space . However, in many cases one can ignore one dimension, and let  be a point of the Cartesian plane . This is the case, for example, when studying vibrations of a drum skin. One may even restrict  to a point of the Cartesian line  — that is, the set of real numbers. This is the case, for example, when studying vibrations in a violin string or recorder. The time , on the other hand, is always assumed to be a scalar; that is, a real number.

The value of  can be any physical quantity of interest assigned to the point  that may vary with time. For an electromagnetic wave, the value of  can be the electric field vector , or the magnetic field vector , or any related quantity, such as the Poynting vector . In fluid dynamics, the value of  could be the velocity vector of the fluid at the point , or any scalar property like pressure, temperature, or density. In a chemical reaction,  could be the concentration of some substance in the neighborhood of point  of the reaction medium.

Wave families
Sometimes one is interested in a single specific wave. More often, however, one needs to understand large set of possible waves; like all the ways that a drum skin can vibrate after being struck once with a drum stick, or all the possible radar echos one could get from an airplane that may be approaching an airport.

For example, the sound pressure inside a recorder that is playing a "pure" note is typically a standing wave, that can be written as

(The position  should be measured from the mouthpiece, and the time  from any moment at which the pressure at the mouthpiece is maximum. Many general properties of these waves can be inferred from this general equation, without choosing specific values for the parameters.

As another example, it may be that the vibrations of a drum skin after a single strike depend only on the distance  from the center of the skin to the strike point, and on the strength  of the strike. Then the vibration for all possible strikes can be described by a function .

Sometimes the family of waves of interest has infinitely many parameters. For example, one may want to describe what happens to the temperature in a metal bar when it is initially heated at various temperatures at different points along its length, and then allowed to cool by itself in vacuum. In that case, instead of a scalar or vector, the parameter would have to be a function  such that  is the initial temperature at each point  of the bar. Then the temperatures at later times can be expressed by a function  that depends on the function  (that is, a functional operator), so that the temperature at a later time is

Differential wave equations
Then the family of waves in question consists of all functions  that satisfy those constraints — that is, all solutions of the equation.

This approach is extremely important in physics, because the constraints usually are a consequence of the physical processes that cause the wave to evolve. For example, if  is the temperature inside a block of some homogeneous and isotropic solid material, its evolution is constrained by the partial differential equation

(The symbol "" is meant to signify that, in the derivative with respect to some variable, all other variables must be considered fixed.)

This equation can be derived from the laws of physics that govern the diffusion of heat in solid media. For that reason, it is called the heat equation in mathematics, even though it applies to many other physical quantities besides temperatures.

For another example, we can describe all possible sounds echoing within a container of gas by a function  that gives the pressure at a point  and time  within that container.

This same differential equation describes the behavior of mechanical vibrations and electromagnetic fields in a homogeneous isotropic non-conducting solid. Yet this small change makes a huge difference on the set of solutions . This differential equation is called "the" wave equation in mathematics, even though it describes only one very special kind of waves.

Wave in elastic medium

Consider a traveling transverse wave (which may be a pulse) on a string (the medium). Consider the string to have a single spatial dimension. Consider this wave as traveling

 in the  direction in space. For example, let the positive  direction be to the right, and the negative  direction be to the left.
 with constant amplitude 
 with constant velocity , where  is
 independent of wavelength (no dispersion)
 independent of amplitude (linear media, not nonlinear).
 with constant waveform, or shape

This wave can then be described by the two-dimensional functions

  (waveform  traveling to the right)
  (waveform  traveling to the left)

or, more generally, by d'Alembert's formula:

representing two component waveforms  and  traveling through the medium in opposite directions. A generalized representation of this wave can be obtained as the partial differential equation

General solutions are based upon Duhamel's principle.  

Beside the second order wave equations that are describing a standing wave field, the one-way wave equation describes the propagation of single wave in a defined direction.

Wave forms 

The form or shape of F in d'Alembert's formula involves the argument x − vt. Constant values of this argument correspond to constant values of F, and these constant values occur if x increases at the same rate that vt increases. That is, the wave shaped like the function F will move in the positive x-direction at velocity v (and G will propagate at the same speed in the negative x-direction).

In the case of a periodic function F with period λ, that is, F(x + λ − vt) = F(x − vt), the periodicity of F in space means that a snapshot of the wave at a given time t finds the wave varying periodically in space with period λ (the wavelength of the wave). In a similar fashion, this periodicity of F implies a periodicity in time as well: F(x − v(t + T)) = F(x − vt) provided vT = λ, so an observation of the wave at a fixed location x finds the wave undulating periodically in time with period T = λ/v.

Amplitude and modulation 

The amplitude of a wave may be constant (in which case the wave is a c.w. or continuous wave), or may be modulated so as to vary with time and/or position. The outline of the variation in amplitude is called the envelope of the wave. Mathematically, the modulated wave can be written in the form:

If the group velocity  (see below) is wavelength-independent, this equation can be simplified as:

showing that the envelope moves with the group velocity and retains its shape. Otherwise, in cases where the group velocity varies with wavelength, the pulse shape changes in a manner often described using an envelope equation.

Phase velocity and group velocity 

There are two velocities that are associated with waves, the phase velocity and the group velocity.

Phase velocity is the rate at which the phase of the wave propagates in space: any given phase of the wave (for example, the crest) will appear to travel at the phase velocity. The phase velocity is given in terms of the wavelength  (lambda) and period  as

Group velocity is a property of waves that have a defined envelope, measuring propagation through space (that is, phase velocity) of the overall shape of the waves' amplitudes – modulation or envelope of the wave.

Special waves

Sine waves

Plane waves 

A plane wave is a kind of wave whose value varies only in one spatial direction. That is, its value is constant on a plane that is perpendicular to that direction. Plane waves can be specified by a vector of unit length  indicating the direction that the wave varies in, and a wave profile describing how the wave varies as a function of the displacement along that direction and time. Since the wave profile only depends on the position  in the combination , any displacement in directions perpendicular to  cannot affect the value of the field.

Plane waves are often used to model electromagnetic waves far from a source. For electromagnetic plane waves, the electric and magnetic fields themselves are transverse to the direction of propagation, and also perpendicular to each other.

Standing waves 

A standing wave, also known as a stationary wave, is a wave whose envelope remains in a constant position. This phenomenon arises as a result of interference between two waves traveling in opposite directions.

The sum of two counter-propagating waves (of equal amplitude and frequency) creates a standing wave. Standing waves commonly arise when a boundary blocks further propagation of the wave, thus causing wave reflection, and therefore introducing a counter-propagating wave. For example, when a violin string is displaced, transverse waves propagate out to where the string is held in place at the bridge and the nut, where the waves are reflected back. At the bridge and nut, the two opposed waves are in antiphase and cancel each other, producing a node. Halfway between two nodes there is an antinode, where the two counter-propagating waves enhance each other maximally. There is no net propagation of energy over time.

Physical properties

Propagation

Wave propagation is any of the ways in which waves travel. Single wave propagation can be calculated by second-order wave equation (standing wavefield) or first-order one-way wave equation.

With respect to the direction of the oscillation relative to the propagation direction, we can distinguish between longitudinal wave and transverse waves.

Electromagnetic waves propagate in vacuum as well as in material media. Propagation of other wave types such as sound may occur only in a transmission medium.

Reflection of plane waves in a half-space  

The propagation and reflection of plane waves—e.g. Pressure waves (P-wave) or Shear waves (SH or SV-waves) are phenomena that were first characterized within the field of classical seismology, and are now considered fundamental concepts in modern seismic tomography. The analytical solution to this problem exists and is well known. The frequency domain solution can be obtained by first finding the Helmholtz decomposition of the displacement field, which is then substituted into the wave equation. From here, the plane wave eigenmodes can be calculated.

SV wave propagation 

The analytical solution of SV-wave in a half-space indicates that the plane SV wave reflects back to the domain as a P and SV waves, leaving out special cases. The angle of the reflected SV wave is identical to the incidence wave, while the angle of the reflected P wave is greater than the SV wave. For the same wave frequency, the SV wavelength is smaller than the P wavelength. This fact has been depicted in this animated picture.

P wave propagation 
Similar to the SV wave, the P incidence, in general, reflects as the P and SV wave. There are some special cases where the regime is different.

Wave velocity 

Wave velocity  is a general concept, of various kinds of wave velocities, for a wave's phase and speed concerning energy (and information) propagation. The phase velocity is given as:

where:
vp is the phase velocity (in meters per second, m/s),
ω is the angular frequency (in radians per second, rad/s),
k is the wavenumber (in radians per meter, rad/m).

The phase speed gives you the speed at which a point of constant phase of the wave will travel for a discrete frequency. The angular frequency ω cannot be chosen independently from the wavenumber k, but both are related through the dispersion relationship:

In the special case , with c a constant, the waves are called non-dispersive, since all frequencies travel at the same phase speed c. For instance electromagnetic waves in vacuum are non-dispersive. In case of other forms of the dispersion relation, we have dispersive waves. The dispersion relationship depends on the medium through which the waves propagate and on the type of waves (for instance electromagnetic, sound or water waves).

The speed at which a resultant wave packet from a narrow range of frequencies will travel is called the group velocity and is determined from the gradient of the dispersion relation:

In almost all cases, a wave is mainly a movement of energy through a medium. Most often, the group velocity is the velocity at which the energy moves through this medium.

Waves exhibit common behaviors under a number of standard situations, for example:

Transmission and media 

Waves normally move in a straight line (that is, rectilinearly) through a transmission medium. Such media can be classified into one or more of the following categories:
 A bounded medium if it is finite in extent, otherwise an unbounded medium
 A linear medium if the amplitudes of different waves at any particular point in the medium can be added
 A uniform medium or homogeneous medium if its physical properties are unchanged at different locations in space
 An anisotropic medium if one or more of its physical properties differ in one or more directions
 An isotropic medium if its physical properties are the same in all directions

Absorption 

Waves are usually defined in media which allow most or all of a wave's energy to propagate without loss. However materials may be characterized as "lossy" if they remove energy from a wave, usually converting it into heat. This is termed "absorption." A material which absorbs a wave's energy, either in transmission or reflection, is characterized by a refractive index which is complex. The amount of absorption will generally depend on the frequency (wavelength) of the wave, which, for instance, explains why objects may appear colored.

Reflection 

When a wave strikes a reflective surface, it changes direction, such that the angle made by the incident wave and line normal to the surface equals the angle made by the reflected wave and the same normal line.

Refraction 

Refraction is the phenomenon of a wave changing its speed. Mathematically, this means that the size of the phase velocity changes. Typically, refraction occurs when a wave passes from one medium into another. The amount by which a wave is refracted by a material is given by the refractive index of the material. The directions of incidence and refraction are related to the refractive indices of the two materials by Snell's law.

Diffraction 

A wave exhibits diffraction when it encounters an obstacle that bends the wave or when it spreads after emerging from an opening. Diffraction effects are more pronounced when the size of the obstacle or opening is comparable to the wavelength of the wave.

Interference 

When waves in a linear medium (the usual case) cross each other in a region of space, they do not actually interact with each other, but continue on as if the other one weren't present. However at any point in that region the field quantities describing those waves add according to the superposition principle. If the waves are of the same frequency in a fixed phase relationship, then there will generally be positions at which the two waves are in phase and their amplitudes add, and other positions where they are out of phase and their amplitudes (partially or fully) cancel. This is called an interference pattern.

Polarization 

The phenomenon of polarization arises when wave motion can occur simultaneously in two orthogonal directions. Transverse waves can be polarized, for instance. When polarization is used as a descriptor without qualification, it usually refers to the special, simple case of linear polarization. A transverse wave is linearly polarized if it oscillates in only one direction or plane. In the case of linear polarization, it is often useful to add the relative orientation of that plane, perpendicular to the direction of travel, in which the oscillation occurs, such as "horizontal" for instance, if the plane of polarization is parallel to the ground. Electromagnetic waves propagating in free space, for instance, are transverse; they can be polarized by the use of a polarizing filter.

Longitudinal waves, such as sound waves, do not exhibit polarization. For these waves there is only one direction of oscillation, that is, along the direction of travel.

Dispersion 

A wave undergoes dispersion when either the phase velocity or the group velocity depends on the wave frequency.
Dispersion is most easily seen by letting white light pass through a prism, the result of which is to produce the spectrum of colors of the rainbow. Isaac Newton performed experiments with light and prisms, presenting his findings in the Opticks (1704) that white light consists of several colors and that these colors cannot be decomposed any further.

Mechanical waves

Waves on strings 

The speed of a transverse wave traveling along a vibrating string (v) is directly proportional to the square root of the tension of the string (T) over the linear mass density (μ):

where the linear density μ is the mass per unit length of the string.

Acoustic waves 

Acoustic or sound waves travel at speed given by

or the square root of the adiabatic bulk modulus divided by the ambient fluid density (see speed of sound).

Water waves 

 Ripples on the surface of a pond are actually a combination of transverse and longitudinal waves; therefore, the points on the surface follow orbital paths.
 Sound – a mechanical wave that propagates through gases, liquids, solids and plasmas;
 Inertial waves, which occur in rotating fluids and are restored by the Coriolis effect;
 Ocean surface waves, which are perturbations that propagate through water.

Seismic waves 

Seismic waves are waves of energy that travel through the Earth's layers, and are a result of earthquakes, volcanic eruptions, magma movement, large landslides and large man-made explosions that give out low-frequency acoustic energy.

Doppler effect
The Doppler effect (or the Doppler shift) is the change in frequency of a wave in relation to an observer who is moving relative to the wave source. It is named after the Austrian physicist Christian Doppler, who described the phenomenon in 1842.

Shock waves 

A shock wave is a type of propagating disturbance. When a wave moves faster than the local speed of sound in a fluid, it is a shock wave. Like an ordinary wave, a shock wave carries energy and can propagate through a medium; however, it is characterized by an abrupt, nearly discontinuous change in pressure, temperature and density of the medium.

Other 
 Waves of traffic, that is, propagation of different densities of motor vehicles, and so forth, which can be modeled as kinematic waves
 Metachronal wave refers to the appearance of a traveling wave produced by coordinated sequential actions.

Electromagnetic waves 

An electromagnetic wave consists of two waves that are oscillations of the electric and magnetic fields. An electromagnetic wave travels in a direction that is at right angles to the oscillation direction of both fields. In the 19th century, James Clerk Maxwell showed that, in vacuum, the electric and magnetic fields satisfy the wave equation both with speed equal to that of the speed of light. From this emerged the idea that light is an electromagnetic wave. Electromagnetic waves can have different frequencies (and thus wavelengths), giving rise to various types of radiation such as radio waves, microwaves, infrared, visible light, ultraviolet, X-rays, and Gamma rays.

Quantum mechanical waves

Schrödinger equation 
The Schrödinger equation describes the wave-like behavior of particles in quantum mechanics. Solutions of this equation are wave functions which can be used to describe the probability density of a particle.

Dirac equation 
The Dirac equation is a relativistic wave equation detailing electromagnetic interactions. Dirac waves accounted for the fine details of the hydrogen spectrum in a completely rigorous way. The wave equation also implied the existence of a new form of matter, antimatter, previously unsuspected and unobserved and which was experimentally confirmed. In the context of quantum field theory, the Dirac equation is reinterpreted to describe quantum fields corresponding to spin- particles.

de Broglie waves 

Louis de Broglie postulated that all particles with momentum have a wavelength

where h is Planck's constant, and p is the magnitude of the momentum of the particle. This hypothesis was at the basis of quantum mechanics. Nowadays, this wavelength is called the de Broglie wavelength. For example, the electrons in a CRT display have a de Broglie wavelength of about 10−13 m.

A wave representing such a particle traveling in the k-direction is expressed by the wave function as follows:

where the wavelength is determined by the wave vector k as:

and the momentum by:

However, a wave like this with definite wavelength is not localized in space, and so cannot represent a particle localized in space. To localize a particle, de Broglie proposed a superposition of different wavelengths ranging around a central value in a wave packet, a waveform often used in quantum mechanics to describe the wave function of a particle. In a wave packet, the wavelength of the particle is not precise, and the local wavelength deviates on either side of the main wavelength value.

In representing the wave function of a localized particle, the wave packet is often taken to have a Gaussian shape and is called a Gaussian wave packet. Gaussian wave packets also are used to analyze water waves.

For example, a Gaussian wavefunction ψ might take the form:

at some initial time t = 0, where the central wavelength is related to the central wave vector k0 as λ0 = 2π / k0. It is well known from the theory of Fourier analysis, or from the Heisenberg uncertainty principle (in the case of quantum mechanics) that a narrow range of wavelengths is necessary to produce a localized wave packet, and the more localized the envelope, the larger the spread in required wavelengths. The Fourier transform of a Gaussian is itself a Gaussian. Given the Gaussian:

the Fourier transform is:

The Gaussian in space therefore is made up of waves:

that is, a number of waves of wavelengths λ such that kλ = 2 π.

The parameter σ decides the spatial spread of the Gaussian along the x-axis, while the Fourier transform shows a spread in wave vector k determined by 1/σ. That is, the smaller the extent in space, the larger the extent in k, and hence in λ = 2π/k.

Gravity waves 

Gravity waves are waves generated in a fluid medium or at the interface between two media when the force of gravity or buoyancy tries to restore equilibrium. A ripple on a pond is one example.

Gravitational waves 

Gravitational waves also travel through space. The first observation of gravitational waves was announced on 11 February 2016.
Gravitational waves are disturbances in the curvature of spacetime, predicted by Einstein's theory of general relativity.

See also 
 Index of wave articles

Waves in general

Parameters

Waveforms

Electromagnetic waves

In fluids

 Airy wave theory, in fluid dynamics
 Capillary wave, in fluid dynamics
 Cnoidal wave, in fluid dynamics
 Edge wave, a surface gravity wave fixed by refraction against a rigid boundary
 Faraday wave, a type of wave in liquids
 Gravity wave, in fluid dynamics
 Internal wave, a wave within a fluid medium
 Shock wave, in aerodynamics
 Sound wave, a wave of sound through a medium such as air or water
 Tidal wave, a scientifically incorrect name for a tsunami
 Tollmien–Schlichting wave, in fluid dynamics
 Wind wave

In quantum mechanics

In relativity

Other specific types of waves

 Alfvén wave, in plasma physics
 Atmospheric wave, a periodic disturbance in the fields of atmospheric variables
 Fir wave, a forest configuration
 Lamb waves, in solid materials
 Rayleigh wave, surface acoustic waves that travel on solids
 Spin wave, in magnetism
 Spin density wave, in solid materials
 Trojan wave packet, in particle science
 Waves in plasmas, in plasma physics

Related topics

 Absorption (electromagnetic radiation)
 Antenna (radio)
 Beat (acoustics)
 Branched flow
 Cymatics
 Diffraction
 Dispersion (water waves)
 Doppler effect
 Envelope detector
 Fourier transform for computing periodicity in evenly spaced data
 Group velocity
 Harmonic
 Huygens–Fresnel principle
 Index of wave articles
 Inertial wave
 Least-squares spectral analysis for computing periodicity in unevenly spaced data
 List of waves named after people
 One-Way Wave Equation
 Phase velocity
 Photon
 Polarization (physics)
 Propagation constant
 Radio propagation
 Ray (optics)
 Reaction–diffusion system
 Reflection (physics)
 Refraction
 Resonance
 Ripple tank
 Rogue wave
 Scattering
 Shallow water equations
 Shive wave machine
 Sound
 Standing wave
 Transmission medium
 Velocity factor
 Wave equation
 Wave turbulence
 Wind wave
 Wind wave#Formation

References

Sources

 
 
 
 .
 
 .
 
Crawford jr.,  Frank S. (1968).  Waves (Berkeley Physics Course, Vol. 3), McGraw-Hill,   Free online version

External links

 The Feynman Lectures on Physics: Waves
 Linear and nonlinear waves
 Science Aid: Wave properties – Concise guide aimed at teens

 
Differential equations
Articles containing video clips